¡Chutzpah! is the eighth studio album by The Wildhearts. Recorded in Denmark with producer Jacob Hansen, it was released in Europe and the US on 31 August 2009. Unlike the band's previous releases, where the songs were almost always performed in E tuning, the guitars and bass on the album are tuned to C. It is also rare among the band's releases in that it contains a song, "The Only One", which was neither written nor sung by frontman Ginger, but instead by bassist Scott Sorry.

Track listings

Japan version

A bonus mini album entitled ¡Chutzpah! Jnr. was released in December 2009 exclusively to attendees of the band's December 2009 tour, containing the bonus tracks from the Japanese version of ¡Chutzpah! and several other unreleased tracks.

Personnel
 Ginger – guitar, vocals
 C. J. – guitar, vocals
 Ritch Battersby – drums, vocals
 Scott Sorry – bass, vocals

References 

The Wildhearts albums
2009 albums
Albums produced by Jacob Hansen